Progress and Future of Ceuta, PFC) was a political party established as a grouping of electors ahead of the 1991 Spanish local elections in the city of Ceuta by the then-city's mayor Francisco Fraiz Armada, and was composed by independents and Spanish Socialist Workers' Party (PSOE) disenchanted members. The party accessed government for a first term in 1991 with the support of the United Ceuta (CEU) party, then in 1995 under Basilio Fernández López—to become the first Mayor-President of Ceuta—with the support of both CEU and PSOE. The party would lose all of its parliamentary representation in the 1999 Ceuta Assembly election and would disband shortly thereafter.

Electoral performance

References

Regionalist parties in Spain
1991 establishments in Spain
1999 disestablishments in Spain
Political parties established in 1991
Political parties disestablished in 1999